Louis  Thomassin (1856–1905) was a French bow maker, or Archetier.

He learned his craft in Mirecourt where he worked for the  Bazin Family.  In 1872  he went to Paris  to work for François Nicolas Voirin  and carried on Voirin's shop after his  death. 
He established his own workshop in Paris in 1891.  
His son and pupil, Claude, also made fine bows in Paris, based on Voirin's model. 
Louis Thomassin's branded bows are of beautiful and of consistent quality. Unfortunately his production was not extensive.

References 

 
 
 
 Les Luthiers Parisiens aux XIX et XX siecles Tom 3 "Jean-Baptiste Vuillaume et sa famille - Sylvette Milliot 2006
 
 
 Violins & Bows - Jost Thoene 2006

1856 births
1905 deaths
Bow makers
19th-century French people
Luthiers from Mirecourt